Grrr! 2004 is a live official bootleg album by the Serbian alternative rock/indie pop band La Strada, recorded at the Pančevo 2004 Grrr! festival acoustic performance by the band's former vocalist Slobodan Tišma. The album was released by the independent record label PMK Records in a limited number of 150 copies.

Track listing

Personnel 
 Slobodana Tišma — acoustic guitar, vocals
 Aleksandar Zograf — album cover design

References 

La Strada (band) albums
2011 live albums